An upper mantle body is a geological region where upper mantle rocks (peridotite) outcrop on the surface of the Earth (including the ocean floor).

Upper mantle outcrops include:

 upper mantle made at constructive plate boundaries, but preserved in ophiolites, for example Isabela ophiolite in the Philippines
 upper  mantle above subduction zones, so called suprasubduction ophiolites (Example Troodos Ophiolite, Cyprus )
 upper mantle exposed by thinning of continental crust by extension to continental crust removal (Ligurian "Ophiolites" and conjugate margin of Iberia and Newfoundland)
upper mantle exposures on earth's surface above  sea-water level in Oceans (whose ocean floor is covered with oceanic crust). Examples are  Macquarie Island in Pacific and St. Peter and Paul island in Atlantic.
upper mantle exposures on earth's surface on the ocean floor. Examples is  Gakkel Ridge. and Lena Trough
upper mantle exposures on earth's surface of disputed origin
upper mantle exposure on earth's surface of not understood environment

References

Orogeny
Geology terminology